Jakob Guttmann (22 April 1845 in Beuthen, Oberschlesien – 29 September 1919 in Breslau) was a German theologian and philosopher of religion (Religionsphilosoph). He officiated as chief rabbi of the Land rabbinate of Hildesheim between 1874 and 1892. Thereafter he served as rabbi in Breslau until his death.

He was the father of Julius Guttmann.

Works 
 Die Religionsphilosophie des Abraham ibn Daud aus Toledo, Göttingen 1879
 Die Religionsphilosophie des Saadja, Göttingen 1882
 Jacob Guttmann: Die Philosophie des Salomon ibn Gabirol, Göttingen : Vandenhoeck & Ruprecht 1889, Repr. Hildesheim : Olms 1979
 Das Verhältnis des Thomas von Aquino zum Judentum und zur jüdischen Literatur, Göttingen 1891
 Über Dogmenbildung im Judenthum. Vortrag. Hrsg. vom Verein für jüdische Geschichte und Literatur zu Breslau. Breslau, Wilh. Jacobsohn & Co., 1894
 Die Scholastik des 13. Jahrhunderts in ihren Beziehungen zum Judentum und zur jüdischen Literatur, Breslau 1902
 Die religionsphilosophischen Lehren des Isaak Abravanel, Breslau : Marcus 1916
 Fest- u. Sabbatpredigten, hrsg. v. Julius Guttmann, Frankfurt am Main : J. Kauffmann 1926.

External links 
 
 V.Die Hildesheimer Rabbiner (German, PDF)
 Digitized works by Jakob Guttmann at the Leo Baeck Institute, New York

1845 births
1919 deaths
19th-century German rabbis
Jewish philosophers
German philosophers
Philosophers of Judaism
Silesian Jews
People from the Province of Silesia
People from Bytom
20th-century German rabbis
German male writers